General elections were held in Aruba on 28 September 2001. The result was a victory for the People's Electoral Movement, which won 12 of the 21 seats in the Estates.

Results

References

Elections in Aruba
Aruba
2001 in Aruba
September 2001 events in North America